Guting District was a district in Taipei, Taiwan, located in the southwestern part of Taipei.

History 
The name “Guting” is derived from the ancient place name Ku-ting.

In 1946, the Taiwan Province Administrative Official Public Ministry made those villages incorporated as Guting District.

In 1990, 16 districts in Taipei City were consolidated into the current 12 districts. Most of Guting District were merged into Zhongzheng District along with Chengzhong District, moreover the rest were annexed into Daan District and Wanhua District.

Geography 
Guting District bordered Chengzhong District to the north, Daan District to the east, Shuangyuan District to the west and Longshan District to the northwest. The Xindian River run by its south.

Education and Medical Institutions

Universities and Colleges 
National Taiwan University
National Taiwan Normal University

High school 
Taipei Municipal Chien Kuo High School

Medical Institutions 
Postal Hospital
Women's and Children's Hospital (Fuyou Hospital)
Heping Hospital
Tri-Service General Hospital

Government Institutions 
Central Bank of the Republic of China
Ministry of Finance of the Republic of China
Ministry of Economic Affairs of the Republic of China
Council of Agriculture of the Republic of China
Taiwan Tobacco and Wine Monopoly Bureau
Bureau of Labor Insurance

Places of Interest 
Youth Park
Taipei Botanical Garden
National Museum of History
Taipei City Children's Museum of Transportation

References 

1990 disestablishments in Taiwan
Districts of Taipei